The Sutro Tunnel is a drainage tunnel (adit) connected to the Comstock Lode in Northern Nevada. It begins at Dayton, Nevada and connects  Northwest to the Savage mine in Virginia City, Nevada. The Sutro Tunnel pioneered the excavation of large drainage and access tunnels in the US.  Later US mine drainage tunnels included the Argo Tunnel at Idaho Springs, Colorado, the Leadville and Yak tunnels at Leadville, Colorado, and the Roosevelt tunnel in the Cripple Creek district, Colorado.

History
The tunnel was proposed by Adolph Sutro, a Prussian Jewish mining entrepreneur, in 1860. He promoted the drainage tunnel to allow access to deeper mineral exploration in the Comstock. Flooding and inadequate pumps had inhibited some exploration until that time.

By 1865, Sutro's idea had gained the approval of the state and US federal governments. The mining interests of the Comstock initially supported the project, but later opposed the idea. They feared that an alternate access point to the Comstock minerals would threaten their monopoly on the mining and milling of gold and silver in the Comstock.

Nonetheless, Sutro formed the Sutro Tunnel Company, selling stock certificates to raise funds for its construction, which began in 1869. Financing also came from local miners motivated by the prospect of improved mine safety. This motivation was further advocated by Sutro after the Yellowjacket mine disaster where dozens of miners were burned to death because they could not escape.

Arthur De Wint Foote worked on the tunnel in 1873, but was fired in 1874, having struck a flood of water in Shaft No. 2.

The main tunnel connected to the Savage Mine in 1878, the North and South branches were completed in 1879. Water was released from the mines on June 30th of 1879. Upon completion, Adolph Sutro sold his interest in the tunnel company. However, he stayed on as a board member and moved to San Francisco, later becoming mayor, building the Sutro Baths and much more. Adolph's brother Theodore Sutro then took over control of the Sutro Tunnel Company until 1894 when he then sold it to Franklin Leonard Sr.

Friends of Sutro
The Friend of Sutro Tunnel organization is working to preserve this significant part of Nevada's mining history by restoring the Sutro Tunnel Site.  The goal of the project is to not only preserve the site's historical integrity, but to also make it safe and accessible for visitors.  Phase One of the project is currently underway with the focus being on ongoing site cleanup and protecting remaining structures from further deterioration.

In popular culture
Mark Twain references the tunnel in Roughing It.

References

External links
SAH Archipedia Building Entry
A Guide to the 	Sutro Tunnel Company records, NC07. Special Collections, University Libraries, University of Nevada, Reno.
Friends of Sutro Tunnel

Further reading
, Sutro's argument and proposal for the tunnel

Tunnels in Nevada
Mining in Nevada
Silver mining in the United States
Buildings and structures in Virginia City, Nevada
1870s in Nevada
Tunnels completed in 1878
1878 establishments in Nevada
Buildings and structures in Lyon County, Nevada
Buildings and structures in Storey County, Nevada
History of Nevada
History of Storey County, Nevada
Drainage tunnels in the United States